Ahe Airport  is an airport on Ahe (Tenukupara), an atoll in French Polynesia .

Airlines and destinations

Statistics

See also
List of airports in French Polynesia

References

External links
 Atoll list (in French)
 Classification of the French Polynesian atolls by Salvat (1985)

Airports in French Polynesia
Atolls of the Tuamotus